Anstruther Lifeboat Station is a Royal National Lifeboat Institution (RNLI) station located in the town of Anstruther, Fife. The station has been in operation since 1865, although RNLI activity in the area dates back to 1832. The station houses the all-weather Mersey-class lifeboat Kingdom of Fife and inshore D-class lifeboat Akira.

History
Prior to the establishment of a station, a number of RNLI medals were awarded to coastguards operating in the area. In 1832 the coastguard Kenneth McCulloch was awarded the Silver Medal for saving the three crew of the sloop Vine when it was wrecked at Elie harbour on the 6 March that year. In 1834 two separate rescues were recognised. The Gold Medal bar was awarded to Lt Henry Randall and a Silver Lifeboat to Kenneth McCulloch for rescuing the seven crew of the schooner Wanderer when it was wrecked at Elie in a storm in the preceding year. Silver medals were also awarded to two other coastguards, A Murray and J Mason, for saving the five crew of the schooner John when it got into trouble during bad weather in December 1833.

The first station was established in the town in 1865 at the request of local fishermen on land given by the Anstruther harbour board. Between them they subscribed £60 towards the cost of building the new station. The RNLI supplied the local arranging committee with a 32 foot long pulling lifeboat with 10 oars. This was built from a £600 gift to the institution from a lady in Cheltenham. In 1892 the RNLI local inspector found there was no need to employ a paid bowman for the lifeboat as the station at that time had six volunteer coxswains and a full crew to staff it, by 1899 the number of coxswains had reduced to four. Up until 1897 the station had used a mortar to alert the volunteer crew, however this was deemed too dangerous to vessels in the harbour so a handbell was used from that point on.

In 1904 a new lifeboat house was constructed costing over £1,600. Around this time a new Coxswain Superintendent was appointed to replace the numerous coxswains who has operated the station before on a rotating basis.

In 1965 a new Oakley-class lifeboat was sent to the station. It was named The Doctors in a ceremony by Princess Alice in memory of the family of Dr Nora Allan who had gifted the cost of the lifeboat. At this time the station was re-adapted for the new lifeboat, a trailer and tractor. The Doctors was withdrawn from the station after 26 years and was replaced by a Mersey-class lifeboat in 1991 – at this time the slipway was refurbished and the boathouse extended and modernised. Further modifications were made to the boathouse in 1995 with a two-storey extension providing new crew facilities.

Alongside the all-weather Kingdom of Fife, the D-class lifeboat Global Marine commenced a 12 month trial in 2003, before remaining on a permanent basis. In 2009 a new in-shore lifeboat Akira was adopted by the station when the station was again upgraded at a cost of £273,000 to provide permanent housing.

In 2013 the volunteer lifeboat helmsman Barry Gourlay, a mechanical engineer, received the RNLI Bronze Medal and volunteer crew members fisherman Euan Hoggan and PhD student Rebecca Jewell received thanks on vellum for a rescue of two people in difficult sea conditions. MV Princess had run onto rocks near Crail in the early hours and was breaking up in a force 5 winds, heavy rain and a three-metre swell. The volunteer crew used the in-shore lifeboat, later transferring the casualties to Kingdom of Fife. The RNLI stated in the award ceremony in London that the volunteer had "undoubtedly" save the lives of the stricken crew.

In 2019 it was announced that the RNLI planned to build a purpose built new facility further along the shoreline that will be capable of housing a Shannon-class lifeboat. The Anstruther crew featured on a BBC documentary Saving Lives At Sea in 2019.

Fleet

References

Lifeboat stations in Scotland
1865 establishments in Scotland